The Latvian National Independence Movement (LNNK) was a political organization in Latvia from 1988 until 1997.

It formed in 1988 as the radical wing of Latvian nationalist movement. Unlike the mainstream Latvian Popular Front which originally supported more autonomy for Latvia within the Soviet Union, LNNK insisted on independence from its beginning. The leaders of LNNK included Eduards Berklavs, Aleksandrs Kiršteins, Andrejs Krastiņš, Einars Repše and Juris Dobelis.

After Latvia regained independence, LNNK became a political party and renamed itself the National Conservative Party. It won 15 seats out of 100 in the 1993 parliamentary election and was an influential opposition party. In 1993 its candidate for Prime Minister was Joachim Siegerist, who lost by only one vote and ended up second. LNNK won the municipal election in the Latvian capital, Riga in 1994 but its popularity quickly faded after that. It lost half of its seats in the parliament in the 1995 parliamentary election and eventually merged with Tēvzemei un Brīvībai (For Fatherland and Freedom) in 1997, another right-wing party with similar origins in the Latvian independence movement.

After entering into an alliance with For Fatherland and Freedom, the party increasingly sought to propagate a particularly 'Latvian' vision for Latvia as highlighted by a series of controversial adverts encouraging the consumption of Latvian goods, and warning of the dangers of non-Latvians.

An organization with similar aims and almost identical name, the Estonian National Independence Party existed in Estonia.

See also
Conservatism 
Nationalism 
Politics of Latvia

References

Organizations established in 1988
Political parties established in 1988
1988 establishments in the Soviet Union
1988 establishments in Latvia
Pro-independence parties in the Soviet Union
Political parties in Latvia
Organizations based in the Soviet Union
Non-profit organizations based in the Soviet Union
Defunct political parties in Latvia
Independence movements
Popular fronts
Anti-communism in Latvia
Singing Revolution
Latvian nationalism